SpaceCube is a family of high-performance reconfigurable systems designed for spaceflight applications requiring on-board processing. The SpaceCube was developed by engineers at the NASA Goddard Space Flight Center. The SpaceCube 1.0 system is based on Xilinx's Virtex-4 commercial FPGAs. The debut mission of the SpaceCube 1.0, Hubble Servicing Mission 4, was the first time Xilinx's Virtex-4 FPGAs flew in space.

Missions 
 Hubble Servicing Mission 4: The SpaceCube was the brains of the Relative Navigation Sensors autonomous docking experiment that was intended to run in parallel with the astronaut controlled docking of the Hubble Space Telescope. RNS met its stated goals.
 MISSE-7: The SpaceCube was attached to the outside of the ISS during an EVA on Space Shuttle Mission STS-129 (Nov 2009). It provides an on-orbit test platform for demonstrating innovative radiation hardened by software techniques. It is mounted on the NRL's MISSE7 experiment which is attach to an ExPRESS Logistics Carrier.

Family overview 
 SpaceCube 1.0: Based on Xilinx's Virtex-4 commercial FPGAs.
 SpaceCube 1.5: Intermediate version of SpaceCube 2.0. Based on Xilinx's Virtex-5 commercial FPGAs. Scheduled to fly on sounding rocket flight in the fall of 2010.
 SpaceCube 2.0: Currently under development with over $1 million in funding. The SpaceCube 2.0 system is based around Xilinx's new radiation-hardened Virtex-5 FPGA.

Awards 
NASA's Goddard Space Flight Center SpaceCube team earned an honorable mention for the 2009 "IRAD Innovator of the Year" award.

On-board science data processing achievements 

 Synthetic Aperture Radar (SAR) results:
 6 to 1 loss-less data volume reduction on SAR Nadir Altimetry dataset.
 165x data volume reduction on SAR mapping dataset.

References

External links 
PowerPC405 MIPS Study
Goddard Space Flight Center technologies site
SpaceCube on Facebook
A pose and position measurement system for the Hubble Space Telescope servicing mission
Relative Navigation
Summer 2008 Goddard Tech Trends
MAPLD 2009 RNS SpaceCube
MAPLD 2009 SpaceCube Activities
RHBD Xilinx Virtex-5
Heavy ion SEE test of Xilinx Virtex4 XC4VFX60 FPGA
SpaceCube Virtex-4 FPGA qualification methodology
Spring 2009 Goddard News Tech Transfer
Xilinx XCell Journal Customer Innovation Issue
Media
SpaceCube Photo Gallery on Flickr
MISSE-7 SpaceCube development team
SpaceCube in Atlantis Shuttle bay(The SpaceCube is mounted on the MISSE-7 ExPA on ELC-2 on the bottom right.)
SpaceCube mounted to MISSE7's ExPA(The SpaceCube is the smaller box with several connectors on top)
Naval Research Lab's MISSE-7 Press Release

Hubble Space Telescope
Goddard Space Flight Center
Satellite buses